The Handy Man is a 1918 American silent comedy film featuring Oliver Hardy.

Cast
 Billy West
 Leatrice Joy
 Oliver Hardy (credited as Babe Hardy)
 Ethel Marie Burton
 Leo White
 Joe Bordeaux

Reception
Like many American films of the time, The Handy Man was subject to restrictions and cuts by city and state film censorship boards. For example, the Chicago Board of Censors cut, in Reel 2, girl in swing embracing man with legs, girl on man's back and subsequent scene showing wet floor, and woman coming out of roof dishabille.

See also
 List of American films of 1918
 Oliver Hardy filmography

References

External links

1918 films
American black-and-white films
1918 comedy films
1918 short films
American silent short films
Silent American comedy films
American comedy short films
1910s American films